The first king of the Isdhoo Dynasty was proclaimed king in the year 1692 AD. Isdhoo Dynasty was from Isdhoo Family. This is a short ruling Dynasty. only three kings ruled under this Dynasty. This was because this Dynasty came into being during a time where there was a political turmoil. The first ruler of this Dynasty was Ah'Sultan Ali (seventh) Siri Kularan Mui Mahaaradhun. After he died, his son Ah'Sultan Hassan (tenth)came into throne. After this it was As'Sultan Ibrahim Muth Hirudhdheen Siri Muthei Raskaloska Mahaaradhun.

See also
List of Sultans of the Maldives
List of Sunni Muslim dynasties

Maldivian dynasties